Coahuila Radio is the state radio network of the Mexican state of Coahuila, broadcasting on 16 transmitters in the state. Radio Coahuila's studios are located in the capital city of Saltillo, in a state office building on Periférico Luis Echeverría, alongside the Saltillo transmitter.

History
The state received the permits for the 16 stations on November 29, 2000. XHSOC in Saltillo began transmitting on March 26, 2001; the signal is fed to the other transmitters by satellite. The network has gone through several different names; at one point, it was known as Radio Gente.

The state network was constituted as a separate government agency on February 28, 2014. On March 8, 2019, by decree, the name of the agency was changed from Radio Coahuila to Coahuila Radio y Televisión in anticipation of the construction and launch of XHPBSA-TDT 17 in Saltillo.

Transmitters
16 transmitters provide Coahuila Radio service to the state's populated areas. Most of the network's transmitters are located at state-run technical and secondary schools, with the notable exceptions of Parras de la Fuente, Saltillo and Torreón.

References

Radio stations in Coahuila
Mass media in Saltillo
Mass media in Torreón
Radio stations in the Comarca Lagunera
Cuatrociénegas Municipality
Public radio in Mexico
Government of Coahuila